The 42nd Walker Cup Match was played on September 12 and 13, 2009 at the Merion Golf Club (East course) in Ardmore, Pennsylvania, United States. Team United States won 16½ to 9½ for its third consecutive win.

Format
On Saturday, there are four matches of foursomes in the morning and eight singles matches in the afternoon. On Sunday, there are again four matches of foursomes in the morning, followed by ten singles matches (involving every player) in the afternoon. This was a change from previous years (and the first format change in 46 years) when there were only eight singles matches on Sunday. In all, 26 matches are played.

Each of the 26 matches was worth one point in the larger team competition. If a match was all square after the 18th hole extra holes were not played. The team with most points won the competition. If the two teams were tied, the previous winner would retain the trophy.

The course
The Merion Golf Club (East course) in Ardmore, Pennsylvania is a par 70 course. Hugh Irvine Wilson is credited with designing it, and it opened for play in 1912. It has hosted various USGA events including six U.S. Amateurs, four U.S. Women's Amateurs, and four U.S. Opens. It has also hosted the Curtis Cup and Eisenhower Trophy team events.

Teams
Ten players for the USA and Great Britain & Ireland participate in the event plus one non-playing captain for each team.

Saturday's matches

Morning foursomes

Afternoon singles

Sunday's matches

Morning foursomes

Afternoon singles

References

External links
Official site
http://www.walkercuphistory.com - definitive site containing complete history and statistics (paid subscription site).
Merion Golf Club

Walker Cup
Golf in Pennsylvania
Walker Cup
Walker Cup
Walker Cup
Walker Cup